Illi Cerys Gardner (born 14 October 1999) is a British professional racing cyclist.

On 14 August 2021 she set a new women's world Everesting record of 8 hours 33 minutes and 47 seconds, beating Emma Pooley's 2020 record by almost 20 minutes by riding up and down Bwlch y Groes 72 times.

On 23 July 2022 she set a further women's world Everesting record of 8 hours 3 minutes and 29 seconds, improving on her previous record by over 30 minutes by riding up and down the Crowcombe climb 59 times.

On 30th October 2022 she won the National Hill Climb Championships by over 23 seconds at the Old Shoe climb near Llangollen in North Wales.

References

External links
 
Strava profile - Illi Gardner

1999 births
Living people
British female cyclists
Place of birth missing (living people)
21st-century British women